Revels is an American series of annual theatrical events.

Revels may also refer to:
 Revels (confectionery), a chocolate product made by Mars, Inc.
 Revels (Inns of Court), entertainments at the English Inns of Court in medieval and early modern period
 The Revels, a 1960s surf music group
 The Revels (doo-wop group), an American doo-wop group

See also 
 Cynthia's Revels, a 1600 Elizabethan stage play
 Master of the Revels, a position in the British royal household
 Revel (disambiguation)
 The Revelers, a male close-harmony group founded in the U.S. in 1925